Abéné (also called Abene, Abémé, or Abeme) is a village in the rural community of Kafountine, Kataba Arrondissement, Bignona Department, Ziguinchor Region, in the Basse Casamance area of south-west Senegal. It is located on the Atlantic coast.

Geography
The nearest towns are Folonko, Allahein, Niafourang, Kabadio, Kérouané, Albreda, Kafountine, and Diana.

Population
According to PEPAM (Water and Sanitation Program for the Millennium), there were 1935 people and 269 households in Abéné at the 2002 census.

Economy
With its beautiful beaches, local tourism is growing rapidly. A djembe festival called Abéné Festivalo is organized in the village every year.

External links
 Maps, weather and airports for Abene
 Abene Festivalo
 Abéné on the PEPAM website

Populated places in the Bignona Department